Racine is the second studio album by Canadian rock singer/songwriter Sass Jordan, released on MCA Records 31 March 1992.  Jordan's "barroom hard rock" style on this album has been compared to that of the Black Crowes.

Track listing

Personnel
 Sass Jordan – lead and backing vocals
 Kevin Savigar – keyboards
 Rick Neigher – lead guitar, rhythm guitar, backing vocals 
 Stevie Salas – lead guitar, rhythm guitar
 Johnny Lee Schell – lead guitar, rhythm guitar, backing vocals 
 Eric Bazilian – mandolin
 Gregg Sutton – bass, backing vocals 
 David Raven – drums
 Erik Gloege – percussion, backing vocals
 Jerry Goodman – violin
 C.J. Vanston – string arrangements 
 The Martin Brothers – horns and horn arrangements:
 Andy Martin – trombone
 Scott Martin – saxophones 
 Stan Martin – trumpets

Production
 Producer – Rick Neigher 
 A&R – Randy Nicklaus
 Engineers – Dennis Mackay and Ed Thacker
 Mixed by Ed Thacker
 Mastered by Greg Calbi at Sterling Sound (New York City, New York).
 Production Coordination – Paul Leighton and Mark Sullivan 
 Art Direction and Design – Jim Pezzullo at Studio Seereeni.
 Photography – Moshe Brakha
 Wardrobe Design – Karen Dusenberry
 Hair – Susan Mancini
 Makeup – Terri Apansewicz
 Management – Bruce Bird and Lisa Janzen at Camel-Z.

References

1992 albums
Sass Jordan albums
MCA Records albums